The 15 cm hrubá houfnice vz. 25 (Heavy howitzer model 25) was a Czech heavy howitzer used in the Second World War. It was taken into Wehrmacht service as the 15 cm sFH 25(t). Slovakia had 126 in inventory.

Design & History
Intended to replace the various Austro-Hungarian heavy howitzer that the Czechs had inherited, they began a program to develop a new howitzer shortly after achieving independence in 1919. It didn't reflect many of the lessons of World War I as it retained a box trail and wooden wheels suitable only for horse traction. Its carriage broke down into two loads for transport. It fired a  shell.

Notes

References
 Engelmann, Joachim and Scheibert, Horst. Deutsche Artillerie 1934-1945: Eine Dokumentation in Text, Skizzen und Bildern: Ausrüstung, Gliederung, Ausbildung, Führung, Einsatz. Limburg/Lahn, Germany: C. A. Starke, 1974
 Gander, Terry and Chamberlain, Peter. Weapons of the Third Reich: An Encyclopedic Survey of All Small Arms, Artillery and Special Weapons of the German Land Forces 1939-1945. New York: Doubleday, 1979 
 Kliment, Charles K. and Nakládal, Bretislav. Germany's First Ally: Armed Forces of the Slovak State 1939-1945. Atglen, PA: Schiffer, 1997 

World War II artillery of Germany
World War II field artillery
Artillery of Czechoslovakia
150 mm artillery
Military equipment introduced in the 1920s